Tony DeHart (born March 20, 1990) is an American former professional ice hockey defenseman. He last played competitively with HC Eppan Pirates of the then Serie A.  DeHart was selected by the New York Islanders in the 5th round (125th overall) of the 2010 NHL Entry Draft.

Playing career
DeHart played Junior Hockey in the Ontario Hockey League with the London Knights and Oshawa Generals.

During the 2011-12 season DeHart played 46 games in the ECHL with the Stockton Thunder.  On July 12, 2012, he was re-signed by Stockton for the 2012-13 season.

On July 2, 2013, DeHart was one of the first three players signed by the expansion St. Charles Chill of the Central Hockey League.  Dehart played just 10 games with the Chill during the 2013-14 season before signing with Florida Everblades of the ECHL on December 2, 2013.

On August 13, 2014, DeHart signed with the Gwinnett Gladiators of the ECHL.  On October 15, 2014, before ever playing a Regular Season game for the team, DeHart was released by the Gladiators.

On November 11, 2014, DeHart signed with the Missouri Mavericks of the ECHL.  The next day, before playing a game for the team, DeHart was suspended by the Mavericks.

After being suspended by the Mavericks, DeHart subsequently signed with the Italian club HC Eppan Pirates of Serie A.

References

External links

1990 births
Living people
Ice hockey people from Missouri
American men's ice hockey defensemen
Florida Everblades players
London Knights players
New York Islanders draft picks
Oshawa Generals players
Serie A (ice hockey) players
St. Charles Chill players
Springfield Falcons players
Stockton Thunder players